Mount Schlossbach is a peak just southeast of Mount Nilsen in the south group of the Rockefeller Mountains on Edward VII Peninsula. Discovered by the Byrd Antarctic Expedition on a flight of January 27, 1929, and named for Commander Isaac Schlossbach, U.S. Navy, a member of the Byrd Antarctic Expedition (1933–1935) and member of the United States Antarctic Service (USAS) party which occupied the Rockefeller Mountains seismic station during November–December 1940.

See also
Fokker Rocks

References

Mountains of King Edward VII Land